Leon Botstein (born December 14, 1946 in Zürich, Switzerland) is a Swiss-American conductor, educator, and scholar serving as the President of Bard College.

Biography

1946–1975: Early life, education, and career 
Botstein was born in Zürich, Switzerland in 1946. The son of Polish-Jewish physicians, Botstein immigrated to New York City at the age of two. Interested in music from an early age, he studied violin with Roman Totenberg and, during the summers, studied with faculty from the National Conservatory in Mexico City. At the age of sixteen, Botstein graduated from the High School of Music and Art in Manhattan, and earned a bachelor's degree from the University of Chicago, where he graduated in history and philosophy. While an undergraduate, he was concertmaster and assistant conductor of the University orchestra and founded University of Chicago’s chamber orchestra. His music teachers at University of Chicago included the Pulitzer Prize-winning composer Richard Wernick and the musicologists H. Colin Slim and Howard Mayer Brown. In 1967, after studying at Tanglewood, Botstein then went to Harvard University, where he studied history under David Landes, writing on musical life of Vienna in the 19th and early 20th centuries. At Harvard University, he was the assistant conductor of the Harvard Radcliffe Orchestra, and conductor of the Doctors’ Orchestra of Boston. In 1969, while still a graduate student, Botstein was awarded a Sloan Foundation Fellowship and began work for New York City Mayor John V. Lindsay’s administration as special assistant to the president of the Board of Education of the City of New York. In 1970, at the age of 23, Botstein became the youngest college president in history after his appointment as president of the now-defunct Franconia College in New Hampshire. He was offered the position after meeting his future father-in-law, Oliver Lundquist, who was on the board of trustees. While there Botstein founded the White Mountain Music Festival, an offshoot of which is still operating today.

1975–1990: Developing Bard and return to music
In 1975, Botstein left Franconia to become the president of Bard College, a position he still holds. Botstein oversaw significant curricular changes, and, under his leadership, Bard saw record gains in enrollment, campus growth, endowment, institutional reach, and high-profile faculty. Botstein directed the launch of the Levy Economics Institute, a public-policy research center, as well as graduate programs in the fine arts, decorative arts, environmental policy, and curatorial studies; soon thereafter, he helped acquire Bard College at Simon's Rock and later founded Bard High School Early College, which currently operates in seven cities: Newark, New York City, Cleveland, Washington D.C., Baltimore, New Orleans, and Hudson.

Botstein, in the wake of the death of his second child, an 8-year-old daughter, decided to return to the career in music he had begun at University of Chicago. He completed his Ph.D. in music history at Harvard and began retraining as a conductor with Harold Farberman, eventually leading the Hudson Valley Philharmonic Chamber Orchestra.

1990–present: Festivals, international programs, and conducting
 In 1990, Botstein established the Bard Music Festival, whose success led to the development of the critically acclaimed Richard B. Fisher Center for the Performing Arts, a multi-functional facility designed by Frank Gehry on the Bard College campus. In 1992, in addition to being named editor of the esteemed The Musical Quarterly, he was appointed the director of the American Symphony Orchestra, a position he still holds. Under Botstein’s directorship, the orchestra has developed a reputation for rescuing lesser-known works from obscurity. In 1999, he helped establish Bard’s acclaimed Prison Initiative, which established college-in-prison programs across the country and is now active in nine states.

In 2003, following the success of the Bard Music Festival, Botstein developed Bard SummerScape, a festival of opera, theater, film, and music, where, since its founding, he has revived thirteen rare operas in full staging. Later that year, Botstein became the music director of the Jerusalem Symphony Orchestra. His concerts with the Jerusalem Symphony Orchestra were broadcast in regular series across the United States and Europe, and he led the orchestra on several tours, including twice across the United States and to Leipzig to open the 2009 Bach Festival with a performance of Felix Mendelssohn’s Elijah in Bach’s Thomaskirche. In 2011, he stepped down from that post and became the Jerusalem Symphony Orchestra's Conductor Laureate and, as of 2022, also serves as its Principal Guest Conductor. In addition to his work with the ASO and JSO, Botstein has performed or recorded with, among many others, the London Philharmonic Orchestra, New York City Opera, Los Angeles Philharmonic, BBC Symphony Orchestra, London Symphony Orchestra, Buffalo Philharmonic Orchestra, St. Petersburg Philharmonic Orchestra, Mariinsky Theatre Orchestra, and NDR Symphony Orchestra. In 2005, his recording of Gavriil Popov’s First Symphony with the London Symphony Orchestra was nominated for a Grammy Award.

Throughout this period, in collaboration with institutions abroad, Botstein helped launch liberal arts programs to countries in Eastern Europe, the former Soviet Union, South Africa, Central Asia, and the Middle East. Botstein established programs with Al Quds University, American University of Central Asia, and Central European University, as well as helped found Bard College Berlin and Smolny College, Russia's first and foremost liberal arts institution.

Botstein also turned his attention to developing Bard's music program. In 2005, Botstein oversaw the development of The Bard College Conservatory of Music, whose dean is currently Tan Dun, and later became director of The Bard Conservatory Orchestra. During this period, he also helped Bard acquire The Longy School of Music, as well as led The Bard Conservatory Orchestra on tours of China, Eastern Europe, and Cuba. In addition to conducting for the Youth Orchestra of Caracas in Venezuela and on tour in Japan, Botstein also helped develop Take a Stand, a national music program in the United States based on principles of El Sistema. In 2015, Botstein founded the critically acclaimed The Orchestra Now, a pre-professional orchestra and master’s degree program at Bard College; in addition to performing multiple concerts each season at Carnegie Hall and Lincoln Center, The Orchestra Now also performs a regular concert series at Bard's Fisher Center and also takes part in Bard Music Festival concerts.

In 2018, Botstein was appointed artistic director of Campus Grafenegg in Austria, where he collaborated with Thomas Hampson and Dennis Russell Davies. On January 23, 2020, Botstein was named chancellor of the Open Society University Network, of which Bard College and Central European University are founding members.

In 2019, Botstein appeared in the documentary College Behind Bars, a four-part television series about the Bard Prison Initiative, a degree program offered to inmates in New York prisons. The series was produced by his daughter, Sarah Botstein, who works for Ken Burns' documentary production company.

Musicianship 
Botstein is renowned for reviving and promoting neglected repertoire and composers. In addition, as director of the American Symphony Orchestra and the Jerusalem Symphony Orchestra, Botstein emerged as a significant proponent of "thematic programming," which assembles concert programs around common themes grounded in literature, music history, or art. He is also known for a series called "Classics Declassified," in which Botstein lectures, conducts, and takes questions from the audience. Both the Bard Music Festival and Bard SummerScape, where Botstein has revived thirteen rare operas in full staging, continue Botstein's method of reviving neglected works and synthesizing performance and scholarship, as the Wall Street Journal Barrymore Laurence Scherer observed, "the Bard Music Festival…no longer needs an introduction. Under the provocative guidance of the conductor-scholar Leon Botstein, it has long been one of the most intellectually stimulating of all American summer festivals and frequently is one of the most musically satisfying. Each year, through discussions by major scholars and illustrative concerts often programmed to overflowing, Bard audiences have investigated the oeuvre of a major composer in the context of the society, politics, literature, art and music of his times."

Scholarship and writings 
Botstein's scholarship focuses on the intersection of music, culture, and politics since the early nineteenth century. He has written several books including Judentum und Modernitaet and Von Beethoven zu Berg: Das Gedächtnis der Moderne. In addition, Botstein is coeditor of Vienna: Jews and the City of Music, 1870-1938 (Princeton University Press), editor of The Complete Brahms: A Guide to the Musical Works of Johannes (W.W. Norton), and author of the forthcoming The History of Listening: How Music Creates Meaning (Basic Books), an historical inquiry into the function of music. In addition, his essays for The Bard Music Festival are published as a series in the Princeton University Press. He is editor of The Musical Quarterly and a frequent contributor to periodicals focusing on music and history. Botstein also writes frequently on primary and secondary education and universities: in addition to the book Jefferson's Children: Education and the Promise of American Culture, he is the author of numerous articles on education in the United States.

Personal life 
Botstein is the brother of biologist David Botstein and pediatric cardiologist Eva Griepp, and husband of art historian Barbara Haskell. Both of Botstein's parents were physicians who, after emigrating to the United States, served on faculty of the Einstein College of Medicine in New York. He and his first wife, Jill Lundquist, are the parents of Sarah Botstein, who produced the documentary College Behind Bars about the Bard Prison Initiative, and Abby Botstein (1973 - October 6, 1981).  He and Haskell are the parents of Clara Haskell Botstein, Director of Legislation and Governmental Relations at the DC Office of the Deputy Mayor for Education, and Max Botstein.

Awards

Books

Selected articles, essays, and chapters
 (2020) 
 (2020) 
 (2020) 
 (2018) 
 (2017) 
 (2017) 
 (2016) 
 (2016) 
 (2016) 
 (2016) 
 (2015) 
 (2014) 
 (2014) 
 (2014) 
 (2013) 
 (2011) 
 (2010) 
 (2010) 
 (2009) 
 (2009) 
 (2008) 
 (2007) 
 (2006) 
 (2006) 
 (2005) 
 (2004) 
 (2003) 
 (2003) 
 (2001) 
 (2001) 
 (2000) 
 (2000)

Selected recordings
 (2020) Arthur Honegger, Dimitri Mitropoulos, and Othmar Schoeck. The Orchestra Now. Bridge.
 (2020) Erich Wolfgang Korngold, Frederic Chopin, and Nikolai Rimsky-Korsakov. The Orchestra Now with Orion Weiss. Bridge.
 (2019) Arthur Bliss, Edmund Rubbra, and Arnold Bax. The Orchestra Now with Piers Lane. Hyperion.
 (2018) Ferdinand Ries. Piano Concertos No. 8 & 9. The Orchestra Now with Piers Lane. Hyperion.
 (2016) George Gershwin. Gershwin: Rhapsody in Blue, Piano Concerto in F, Variations on "I Got Rhythm," Eight Preludes for Solo Piano. Royal Philharmonic Orchestra with Mark Bebbington. SOMM Recordings.
 (2015) Paul Hindemith. The Long Christmas Dinner. American Symphony Orchestra. Bridge Records.
 (2012) Luigi Dallapiccola. Volo Di Notte. American Symphony Orchestra. 
 (2009) Bruno Walter. Symphony No. 1. NDR Symphony Orchestra, Hamburg. CPO
 (2008) Béla Bartók. Concerto for Orchestra, Four Orchestral Pieces, Hungarian Peasant Songs. London Philharmonic Orchestra. Telarc. 
 (2008) John Foulds. A World Requiem. BBC Symphony Orchestra. Chandos.
 (2007) Paul Dukas. Ariane et Barbe-Bleue. BBC Symphony Orchestra. Telarc.
 (2005) Ernest Chausson. Le roi Arthus. BBC Symphony Orchestra. Telarc.
 (2004) Gavril Popov: Symphony No. 1, Op. 7, Dimitri Shostakovich: Theme & Variations, Op. 3. London Symphonic Orchestra. Terlarc. Nominated for a Grammy Award in Best Orchestral Performance.
 (2005) Aaron Copland, Roger Sessions, George Perle, and Bernard Rands. Works by Copland, Sessions, Perle, and Rands. American Symphony Orchestra. New World Records.
 (2003) Richard Strauss. Die Ägyptische Helena. American Symphony Orchestra with Deborah Voigt. Telarc.
 (2003) Franz Liszt. Dante Symphony. London Symphony Orchestra. Telarc.
 (2000) Richard Strauss. Die Liebe der Danae. American Symphony Orchestra. Telarc.
 (1999) Karl Amadeus Hartmann. Symphonies No. 1 & No. 6. London Philharmonic Orchestra with Jard Van Nes. Telarc.
 (1998) Anton Bruckner. Symphony No. 5. (Schalk Edition). London Philharmonic Orchestra. Telarc.
 (1998) Ernst von Dohnányi. Symphony No. 1. London Philharmonic Orchestra. Telarc.
 (1995) Franz Schubert. Franz Schubert Orchestrated. American Symphony Orchestra. Telarc.
 (1993) Johannes Brahms. Serenade No. 1 In D. American Symphony Orchestra and Chelsea Chamber Ensemble. Vanguard.
 (1991) Joseph Joachim. Overture To Hamlet, Overture To Henry IV, Violin Concerto In D Minor In The Hungarian Manner. London Philharmonic Orchestra with Elmar Oliveira. IMP.

References

External links
 Bard College
 American Symphony Orchestra
 Richard B. Fisher Center for the Performing Arts
 Bard Music Festival
 Bard SummerScape
 Leon Botstein's Discography

American male conductors (music)
American expatriates in Israel
Heads of universities and colleges in the United States
Bard College faculty
Academic staff of Central European University
Harvard University alumni
Jewish American musicians
The High School of Music & Art alumni
Swiss Jews
Swiss emigrants to the United States
1946 births
Living people
Bard College
University of Chicago alumni
21st-century American conductors (music)
Members of the American Philosophical Society